Berkemeier is a surname. Notable people with the surname include:

Ludolph Berkemeier (1864–1930), Dutch painter
Winfried Berkemeier (born 1953), German footballer